Aggabodhi III was King of Anuradhapura in the 7th century, whose reign lasted the year 623 and from 624 to 640. He succeeded his father Silameghavanna as King of Anuradhapura. 

The new king appointed his brother Mana as the governor of Rohana. The king Aggabodhi III was soon challenged by the son of earlier king  Sangha Tissa II, Prince Jettathissa. Prince had a large army mainly drawn from the eastern parts of the Island. Prince Mana dealt a severe defeat to the Prince Jettatssa's general Datasiva in the western part of the country and Datasiva himself was captured by the King's forces. Prince Jettsthissa's main forces were difficult to defeat and the King was defeated. He sought refuge in India.

Aggabodhi III was succeeded by Jettha Tissa III in his first reign.

The fugitive king Aggabodhi soon returned at the head of a large Indian mercenary army, King Jettathissa's army was defeated. The king having ascended the throne again brought the country to peace again.

In 624 king's brother was found guilty of misconduct with the queen and was executed. The younger brother Prince Kasspa was appointed in prince Mana's place. King Jettathissa's general Datopatissa led a rebellion and defeated the King Aggabodh III and the king had seek refuge again in India with only his necklace. The defeated king was succeeded by general Datasive with assumed regnal name Dathopa Tissa I.

King Aggabodhi III returned a second time from india and wrested the throne from Dathopatissa I.The third regnal period was marked with the excesses by prince Kassapa towards the priesthood and the temples which were robbed of their valuables. The king had to spend 1000 massa to repair thuparama dagoba. Before he was able to repair the Dakkinathupa (another temple destroyed by Datopatissa I and prince Kassapa). The Aggabodhi was driven to Rohana and carried out his administration from there during his last years.

See also
 List of Sri Lankan monarchs
 History of Sri Lanka

References

External links
 Kings & Rulers of Sri Lanka
 Codrington's Short History of Ceylon

Monarchs of Anuradhapura
A
A
A